Nasutitermes ceylonicus, is a species of termite of the genus Nasutitermes. It is found in Sri Lanka. It is a pest of tea and coconut. It damages numerous wooden constructions, and timber in buildings.

References

External links
A PRELIMINARY INVENTORY OF SUBTERRANEAN TERMITES IN THE PREMISES OF FACULTY OF SCIENCE, UNIVERSITY OF KELANIYA
[http://www.pdn.ac.lk/purse/Proceedings/2011/ns/ns_14.pdf Termite Assemblages in Lower Hanthana Forest and Variation in Worker Mandible
Structure with Food Type]
[http://hbs.bishopmuseum.org/fiji/pdf/kistner1972.pdf TERMITOPHILES FROM NESTS OF NASUTITERMES COLLECTED BY ALFRED E. EMERSON IN THE
ORIENT]

Termites
Insects described in 1953
Insects of Sri Lanka